The Secret Game is a surviving 1917 American silent drama film produced by Jesse Lasky and released through Paramount Pictures. It was directed by William C. deMille and starred Sessue Hayakawa. It survives complete at the Library of Congress and was released on DVD.

Plot
As described in a film magazine, Kitty Little (Vidor), a German spy under the direction of Dr. Ebell Smith (Ogle), is employed by Major John Northfield (Holt). The spies are anxious to obtain information on the sailing dates of transport ships. Nara-Nara (Hayakawa), a clever Japanese spy, is on the trail of the German spies and suspects Northfield of dishonesty. However, a letter makes him suspect Kitty, whom he has grown to love. Northfield, who also loves Kitty and also suspects her, as a test gives her a blank letter which he tells her to mail as it contains transport sailing dates. Kitty takes the letter to Smith. Nara-Nara follows and in a struggle kills Smith. He then endeavors to force Kitty to go away with him, but she reminds him of his ambition to keep his sword clean and he leaves her. While going to examine the body of Smith, Nara-Nara is killed by one of Smith's accomplices. Northfield comes to Kitty, who is in receipt of a letter from her brother in the German trenches that states he is to be shot for shielding women and children. Kitty becomes a true American and the fiance of Northfield.

Cast
Sessue Hayakawa as Nara-Nara
Jack Holt as Major John Northfield
Florence Vidor as Kitty Little
Mayme Kelso as Miss Loring
Raymond Hatton as 'Mrs. Harris'
Charles Ogle as Dr. Ebell Smith

References

External links
 
allmovie/synopsis Synopsis at allmovie.com

1917 films
1910s spy drama films
American spy drama films
American silent feature films
Films directed by William C. deMille
World War I spy films
American black-and-white films
Paramount Pictures films
1917 drama films
1910s American films
Silent American drama films
Silent war films